Korsakovo is a rural locality (a selo) in Kabansky District, Republic of Buryatia, Russia. The population was 635 as of 2010. There are 7 streets.

Geography 
Korsakovo is located 51 km north of Kabansk (the district's administrative centre) by road. Kudara is the nearest rural locality.

References 

Rural localities in Kabansky District